Graham Wiltshire (16 April 1931 – 2 August 2017) was an English cricketer. He played for Gloucestershire between 1953 and 1960.

A seam bowler, he played 19 times for Gloucestershire with a best bowling performance of 5/53 against Yorkshire.  After he retired from playing he coached Gloucestershire for two decades in the 1970s and 1980s.

References

External links

1931 births
2017 deaths
English cricketers
Gloucestershire cricketers
People from Chipping Sodbury
Sportspeople from Gloucestershire